The 1997–98 CBA season was the third season of the Chinese Basketball Association.

The season ran from November 23, 1997, to March 29, 1998.

The Ji'nan Army and Zhejiang Squirrels had been relegated to the Second Division after the previous season, but extenuating circumstances earned reprieves for both teams, and the league played with the same 12 clubs for the second straight year.

Regular Season Standings
These are the final standings for the 1997-98 CBA regular season.

Playoffs 
The top 8 teams in the regular season advanced to the playoffs.

For the first time, the quarterfinals and semifinals used best-of-three series, to determine the advancing team.

In the best-of-five Finals, the Bayi Rockets defeated the Liaoning Hunters (3-0) to win their third straight CBA championship, remaining unbeaten in their CBA playoffs history.

Teams in bold advanced to the next round. The numbers to the left of each team indicate the team's seeding in regular season, and the numbers to the right indicate the number of games the team won in that round. Home court advantage belongs to the team with the better regular season record; teams enjoying the home advantage are shown in italics.

Relegations
The bottom 4 teams played the relegation phase by round-robin.

The Shenyang Army and Sichuan Pandas were relegated to the Second Division.

CBA Awards
These are the award winners for the 1997-98 CBA regular season.

CBA Most Valuable Player: Gong Xiaobin (Shandong Flaming Bulls)
Sportsmanship Award: Yao Ming (Shanghai Sharks) & James Hodges (Jiangsu Dragons)
Outstanding Coach: Wang Fei (Bayi Rockets) & Ye Peng (Shandong Flaming Bulls)

All-Star Weekend
The 1998 CBA All-Star Game was played on April 4, 1998, in Shenyang, Liaoning.

The International All-Stars defeated the Chinese All-Stars 83–80.

James Hodges from the Jiangsu Dragons won the Slam Dunk Contest for the second straight year, and Zhang Jingsong from the Bayi Rockets won the Three-Point Shootout.

See also
 Chinese Basketball Association

References

 
Chinese Basketball Association seasons
League
CBA